"Strained Relations" is an episode of the BBC sitcom, Only Fools and Horses. It was the second episode of series 4, and was first screened on 28 February 1985.

Synopsis
It is a sad day for Del Boy and Rodney, as their Grandad has died. They have attended Grandad's funeral, along with Mike, Boycie, Trigger, and the North London branch of the Trotter family.

Back at the wake in Nelson Mandela House, Rodney is angry to find that Del is drinking and laughing with his friends instead of mourning. Del and Rodney also meet Grandad's younger brother, their Uncle Albert, who lives with Del and Rodney's cousins Stan and Jean in North London.

Later that night, Del and Rodney are alone in the flat, until a hungover Albert appears from the bathroom. He is informed by his nephews that Stan and Jean have gone home. Del agrees to let Albert stay for the night but does not allow him to sleep in Grandad's bedroom, since it is now a shrine to him (though this does not prevent him using it as a temporary storage area).

Del drives Albert home the next morning, only to return with him after discovering that Stan and Jean (who live in a caravan) have moved. Though Del initially decides to allow Albert to stay with them for a few days until he finds a place of his own, Albert mentions that this is not the first time he has been abandoned; the first relatives he stayed with emigrated while he was out shopping, and the second set fire to the house six months later. Worried that Albert may never leave, Del refuses to shelter Albert and orders him to go to the local Seaman's Mission. As Albert goes off to the kitchen to have a quick drink before leaving, Rodney scolds Del for his nasty attitude towards Albert and for his jolly behaviour during Grandad's wake. Del shouts back at Rodney, explaining that he does not know how to grieve, since always being forced to play the tough guy has led to him becoming a figure of great (but false) admiration, which he detests. Rodney finally understands and meekly apologises.

Later, at The Nag's Head, Albert shows up again, claiming that the Seaman's Mission has been torn down. Del finally relents and decides to let Albert stay with him and Rodney, and a new era for the Trotters begins. As they leave to get a curry, Mike gets hold of Albert and informs him that the Seaman's Mission just called saying they have a room available. Albert quickly tells Mike to be quiet.

Episode cast

First appearances
Buster Merryfield as Uncle Albert

Production
This episode, along with "Happy Returns", was added in at the last minute, due to Lennard Pearce's illness and subsequent death. This left the producers with eight episodes instead of the standard six episodes in Series 4. "From Prussia with Love" was moved to Series 5 leaving seven episodes in Series 4.

References

External links

1985 British television episodes
Only Fools and Horses (series 4) episodes
Television episodes about funerals